Ordination is the process of consecrating clergy.

Ordination may also refer to:
Ordination (statistics), a multivariate statistical analysis procedure
Ordination  (1640),  a painting in Nicolas Poussin's first Seven Sacraments series

See also
Ordination of women
Ordination mill